John C. McGuire (May 12, 1933 – January 2, 2020) was an American politician.

McGuire served as a Democratic member of the Illinois House of Representatives, representing the 86th District from 1990 until his resignation in April 2012. McGuire was born in Joliet, Illinois and graduated from Joliet Catholic High School in 1951. He served in the United States Army during the Korean War and was stationed in Germany. McGuire went to Joliet Junior College and graduated from Colorado State College in 1958.

References

External links
 Illinois General Assembly - Representative Jack McGuire (D) 86th District official IL House website
Bills Committees
Project Vote Smart - Representative John C. 'Jack' McGuire (IL) profile
Follow the Money - John C. (Jack) McGuire
2006 2004 2002 2000 1998 1996 campaign contributions
Illinois House Democrats - Jack McGuire profile

1933 births
2020 deaths
Democratic Party members of the Illinois House of Representatives
People from Joliet, Illinois
Military personnel from Illinois
Joliet Junior College alumni
University of Northern Colorado alumni
21st-century American politicians